10K resolution is any of a number of horizontal display resolutions of around ten-thousand pixels, usually four times that of 5K resolutions: 9,600 or 10,240 pixels. Unlike 4K and 8K, it is not part of UHDTV broadcast standards. The first devices available featured ultra-wide "21:9" screens with the vertical resolution of 8K, which has a native 16:9 aspect ratio.

History
On June 5, 2015, Chinese manufacturer BOE showed a 10K display with an aspect ratio of 64:27 (≈21:9) and a resolution of 102404320.

In November 2016, the Consumer Technology Association published CTA-861-G, an update to their standard for digital video transmission formats. This revision added support for 102404320, a 10K resolution with an aspect ratio of 64:27 (≈21:9), at up to 120Hz.

On January 4, 2017, HDMI version 2.1 was officially announced, and was later released on November 28, 2017. HDMI 2.1 includes support for all the formats listed in the CTA-861-G standard, including 10K (102404320) at up to 120Hz. HDMI 2.1 specifies a new Ultra High Speed HDMI cable which supports a bandwidth of up to 48 Gbit/s. Display Stream Compression (DSC) 1.2a is used for video formats higher than 8K resolution with 4:2:0 chroma subsampling.

10K resolutions are also sometimes seen in the case of gaming, for instance high resolution screenshots in the case of Minecraft with the OptiFine mod.

Cameras
, there are multiple companies producing photo cameras capable of 10K and higher resolutions, such as Phase One, Fujifilm, Hasselblad, and Sony. Other companies also create sensors capable of 10K resolution, though they are mostly not available to the general public, and are often used for scientific or industrial purposes.

Blackmagic Design is the only company producing a video camera capable of filming in resolutions 10K or higher with their URSA Mini Pro 12K.

See also  
 Ultrawide formats

References

External links
 – official site

Film and video technology
Television technology
Digital imaging
Ultra-high-definition television